Adiposogenital dystrophy is a condition that may be caused by tertiary hypogonadism originating from decreased levels in GnRH. Low levels of GnRH has been associated with defects of the feeding centers of the hypothalamus, leading to an increased consumption of food and thus caloric intake.

Presentation
It is characterized by:
 Obesity
 Growth delays and delayed sexual development, atrophy or hypoplasia of the gonads, and altered secondary sex characteristics,
 Headaches
 Problems with vision
 polyuria, polydipsia.

It is usually associated with tumors of the hypothalamus, causing increased appetite and depressed secretion of gonadotropin. It seems to affect males mostly.Many overweight children may appear to have the disorder because of the concurrence of obesity and retarded sexual development; these children have no endocrine disturbances, however, and they mature normally after delayed puberty.

Diagnosis
Laboratory analysis of the urine from children with Froehlich syndrome typically reveals low levels of pituitary hormones, and that finding may suggest the presence of a lesion on the pituitary. Additional tests are needed before a definite diagnosis of Froehlich syndrome may be made.

Treatment
Pituitary extracts may be administered to replace the missing hormones (hormonal replacement therapy) in patients with Froehlich syndrome. Tumors of the hypothalamus should be surgically removed if possible. Appetite may be very difficult to manage, although weight control depends on this.

References

External links 

Growth disorders
Neurological disorders
Hypothalamus disorders
Rare diseases